Bette is a given name, sometimes short for Elizabeth and Bettina, and may refer to:

People
 Bette Davis (1908–1989), American actress
 Bette Franke, Dutch fashion model
 Bette Nesmith Graham (1924–1980), inventor of liquid paper
 Bette Korber, American computational biologist
 Bette Midler (born 1945), American singer and actress
 Bette Otto-Bliesner, American earth scientist

Fictional characters
 Bette Abney, main character in the young adult fiction novels Tiny Pretty Things and Shiny Broken Pieces
 Bette Fischer, title character of Honoré de Balzac's 1846 novel La Cousine Bette and its film adaptations
 Bette Kane, a DC Comics superhero
 Bette Porter, in the television series The L-Word and its sequel The L-Word: Generation Q
 Bette Tattler, in American Horror Story: Freak Show

See also
Betti (given name)
Betty, given name
Bettye, given name

English-language feminine given names